Antonio Palella (8 October 1692, San Giovanni a Teduccio – 7 March 1761, Naples) was an Italian composer and harpsichordist.

Recording
One concerto in Neapolitan Flute Concertos, Auser Musici, Carlo Ipata, director, Hyperion CDA67784 (2010)

1692 births
1761 deaths
Italian classical composers
Italian male classical composers
Italian opera composers
Male opera composers